E3 ubiquitin-protein ligase Praja1 is an enzyme that in humans is encoded by the PJA1 gene.

Interactions 

PJA1 has been shown to interact with UBE2D2 and MAGED1.

References

Further reading